The Democratic Labor Party was a progressive and nationalist political party in South Korea. It was founded in January 2000, in the effort to create a political wing for the Korean Confederation of Trade Unions and was considered more left-wing and more independent of the two union federations in South Korea. Its party president was Kwon Young-gil, Kang Gi-gap, and Lee Jung-hee. In December 2011, the party merged into the Unified Progressive Party.

In the South Korean political history, DLP considered as the ancestor of all of modern day left-leaning political parties such as Justice Party and Progressive Party.

History 
The party gained 10 seats in the National Assembly for the first time in the 2004 parliamentary election, making it the first major left-wing party to enter the Assembly.

Before and during the 2007 presidential election, conflicts arose between the two main factions within the party. The "equality" or the "left" faction, represented by the People's Democracy group, stressed issues ranging from social welfare, civil liberties, and labor rights, and took an antagonistic position against ruling liberal Roh Moo-hyun government.

Against them, the "autonomy" faction, represented by the National Liberation group, emphasized anti-imperialist struggle and viewed Korean reunification to be a paramount goal. In contrast to the "left" faction, "autonomy" faction advocated "democratic coalition government" (민주연립정부) with the ruling Uri Party, and took a reconciliatory position towards Roh government.

After the 2007 presidential election, the People's Democracy faction quit the party and formed the New Progressive Party (NPP). Despite the split, DLP gained 5 seats in the National Assembly in the 2008 election, but NPP gained none. In the 2009 by-election, NPP got one seat. On 5 December 2011, the party merged with the People's Participation Party and a faction of the NPP to found the Unified Progressive Party by Lee jung-hwee.

Political position
The Democratic Labor Party was originally considered as a democratic socialist party, including some left-wing nationalist ideologies. The party strongly opposed two-party system in South Korea, and represented the broad left-wing tendencies against the major liberal and conservative parties.
 
In 2008, the socialist-leaning Minjungminju-wing left the party after the ideological dispute about North Korea and established the New Progressive Party. After the party split, remained nationalist-leaning Minjokhaebang-wing tried to make a partnership with major liberal Democratic Party. From the 2010 local elections, the party joined an electoral coalition with the Democratic Party.
 
In June 2011, the Democratic Labor Party removed "socialism" from the party code and replaced the phrase "socialism" (사회주의) with "progressive democracy" (진보적 민주주의), a liberal ideology.

Election results

President

Legislature

Local

See also
Unified Progressive Party
Politics of South Korea
Lists of political parties
Kwon Young-ghil
Social Democratic Party (Japan) - DLP interacted with major Japanese social democrats and democratic socialist politicians, including Mizuho Fukushima.
Socialism in South Korea

References

External links

2000 establishments in South Korea
Defunct political parties in South Korea
Korean nationalist parties
Left-wing nationalism in South Korea
Left-wing nationalist parties
Labour parties
Political parties established in 2000
Progressive parties in South Korea